İnkılap is a village in the Oğuzeli District, Gaziantep Province, Turkey. The village is inhabited by various tribes of Turkmens.

References

Villages in Oğuzeli District